Bokhi is a village and deh in Badin taluka of Badin District, Sindh. As of 2017, it has a population of 2,848, in 584 households. It is part of the tapedar circle of Qaimpur.

References 

Populated places in Badin District